Galeazzo Gegald or Galeazzo Regardus (fr. Gallois de Regard) was a Roman Catholic prelate who served as Bishop of Bagnoregio (1563-1568).

Biography
On 15 October 1563, Galeazzo Gegald was appointed during the papacy of Pope Pius IV as Bishop of Bagnoregio.
He served as Bishop of Bagnoregio until his resignation in 1568.

Episcopal succession
While bishop, he was the principal consecrator of:
Claude de Granier, Bishop of Geneva (1579);
and the principal co-consecrator of:
Giuliano de' Medici, Bishop of Béziers (1567);
Tommaso Sperandio Corbelli, Bishop of Trogir (1567); 
Andrea Minucci, Archbishop of Zadar (1568); 
Vincenzo Ercolano, Bishop of Sarno (1570); 
Donato Stampa, Bishop of Nepi e Sutri (1570); 
Claude de La Baume, Archbishop of Besançon (1570); 
Nicolò Ormanetto, Bishop of Padua (1570); and
Wolfgang Holl, Auxiliary Bishop of Eichstätt (1570).

References

External links and additional sources
 (for Chronology of Bishops) 
 (for Chronology of Bishops) 

16th-century Italian Roman Catholic bishops
Bishops appointed by Pope Pius IV